Klenovac may refer to:

 Klenovac, Serbia, a village near Zaječar
 Klenovac, Bosanski Petrovac, a village near Bosanski Petrovac
 Klenovac, Croatia, a village near Perušić